The Socialist Party (PS) is a social democratic French-speaking political party in Belgium. As of the 2019 elections, it is the third largest party in the Belgian Chamber of Representatives and the largest Francophone party. The party is led by Paul Magnette. The party supplies the Minister-president of the French Community (Rudy Demotte), and the Brussels-Capital Region (Rudi Vervoort). In the German-speaking community, the party is known as the Sozialistische Partei (SP).

The PS is very commonly part of governing coalitions, and dominates most local authorities because of the extremely fragmented nature of Belgian political institutions, particularly in Francophone areas. In the years since 1999, the PS has simultaneously controlled five regional executive bodies: the Government of the French Community, the Walloon Government, the Government of the Brussels-Capital Region, as well as the COCOF, a local subsidiary in Brussels of the French Community Government, and the Government of the German-speaking Community.

The party, or its members, have from time to time been brought into connection with criminal activities and political scandals, mostly concerning bribery and financial fraud (Cools assassination, Agusta scandal, Dassault Affair, Carolorégienne affair, ICDI affair). The Carolorégienne affair caused Jean-Claude Van Cauwenberghe to step down as Minister-President of the Walloon region.

Electoral results 
The PS performed well in the 2003 general election, but were overtaken as the largest Francophone party by the Reformist Movement in the 2007 general election.

In the 10 June 2007 general elections, the party won 20 out of 150 seats in the Chamber of Representatives and 4 out of 40 seats in the Senate. The PS was a member of the Leterme I Government, Van Rompuy I Government, Leterme II Government and currently the Di Rupo I Government of 6 December 2011, with former PS leader Elio Di Rupo serving as Prime Minister of Belgium.

Timeline
Results for the Chamber of Representatives, in percentages for the Kingdom of Belgium.

Ideology 
The ideology and image of the PS is a mix of social-democracy, combined with a modern electoral marketing. In its political program, the party claims to be progressive and ecosocialist.

Notable figures

Chairmen 
 André Cools, 1978–1981 (previously leader of the Walloon branch of the BSP/PSB)
 Guy Spitaels, 1981–1992
 Philippe Busquin, 1992–1999
 Elio Di Rupo, 1999–2011
 Thierry Giet, 2011–2013 (ad interim)
 Paul Magnette, 2013–2014 (ad interim)
 Elio Di Rupo, 2014–2019
 Paul Magnette, 2019–

Other 
 Rudy Demotte
 André Flahaut
 Jean-Claude Marcourt
 Philippe Moureaux
 Laurette Onkelinx
 Jean-Claude Van Cauwenberghe

Electoral results

Chamber of Representatives

Senate

Regional

Brussels Parliament

Walloon Parliament

German-speaking Community Parliament

European Parliament

See also 
 Charter of Quaregnon

References

External links 

 
 Official website of German-speaking section

Francophone political parties in Belgium
Social democratic parties
Full member parties of the Socialist International
Party of European Socialists member parties
Regionalism (politics)
Political parties established in 1978
1978 establishments in Belgium
Socialist parties in Belgium
Progressive Alliance
Centre-left parties in Europe